Knight of Cups is a 2015 American drama film written and directed by Terrence Malick and produced by Nicolas Gonda, Sarah Green and Ken Kao. The film features an ensemble cast, starring Christian Bale as the central character.

The film follows screenwriter Rick (Bale) on an odyssey through Los Angeles and Las Vegas as he undertakes a series of adventures with colorful figures, identified by seven tarot cards from the Major Arcana, with Bale as the Knight of Cups. The film is loosely inspired by, and at times quotes directly from, the 1678 Christian allegory The Pilgrim's Progress, the Acts of Thomas passage "Hymn of the Pearl," and Suhrawardi's A Tale of the Western Exile.

After over two years in post-production, the film premiered in the main competition section at the 65th Berlin International Film Festival on February 8, 2015 to mixed reviews. It was released in the United States on March 4, 2016, by Broad Green Pictures to more mixed reviews from critics and audiences alike.

Plot
Rick is a screenwriter living in Los Angeles, California. He is successful in his career, but his life feels empty. Haunted by the death of one brother and the dire circumstances of the other, he finds temporary solace in Hollywood excess. Women provide a distraction from the daily pain he endures, and every encounter brings him closer to finding his place in the world.

The film is divided into eight chapters (each named after a tarot card from the Major Arcana except the final chapter, "Freedom"), plus a prologue, each loosely based around the central character's relationship with somebody in his life:

I. The Moon – Della, a rebellious young woman.

II. The Hanged Man – His brother Barry and father Joseph.

III. The Hermit – Tonio, an amoral playboy.

IV. Judgment – His physician ex-wife Nancy.

V. The Tower – Helen, a serene model.

VI. The High Priestess – Karen, a spirited, playful stripper.

VII. Death – Elizabeth, a married woman with whom he has a relationship and who becomes pregnant with a child that may be his.

VIII. Freedom – Isabel, an innocent who helps him see a way forward.

Cast

 Christian Bale as Rick
 Cate Blanchett as Nancy
 Natalie Portman as Elizabeth
 Brian Dennehy as Joseph
 Antonio Banderas as Tonio
 Wes Bentley as Barry
 Isabel Lucas as Isabel
 Teresa Palmer as Karen
 Imogen Poots as Della
 Armin Mueller-Stahl as Father Zeitlinger
 Freida Pinto as Helen
 Cherry Jones as Ruth
 Nick Offerman as Scott
 Clifton Collins Jr. as Jordan
 Dane DeHaan as Paul
 Thomas Lennon as Tom
 Joel Kinnaman as Errol
 Jason Clarke as Johnny
 Katia Winter as Katia
 Nicky Whelan as Nicky
 Shea Whigham as Jim
 Ryan O'Neal as Ryan
 Joe Manganiello as Joe
 Michael Wincott as Herb
 Kevin Corrigan as Gus
 Fabio as Fabio
 Joe Lo Truglio as Guest
 Beau Garrett as Beau
 Nick Kroll as Nick
 Danny Strong as Danny Strong
 Jamie Harris as Burglar
 Dan Harmon as Dan (uncredited)
 Erin McGathy as Erin (uncredited)
Ben Kingsley is among the many narrators, but does not appear in the film.

Themes and motifs

Knight of Cups directly quotes a variety of dream vision works, including John Bunyan's The Pilgrim's Progress (1678), Mark Frost and David Lynch's Twin Peaks, and the Hymn of the Pearl from the Acts of Thomas. The film freely oscillates between depicting Rick's memory, dreams, and "real" experiences, becoming a stream-of-consciousness series of moments and thoughts. Quotations from the Hymn of the Pearl are read in voice-over by Rick's father in the beginning of the film, with many of the lines corresponding to Rick's experiences and feelings. Much like the Hymn of the Pearl's protagonist, Rick is expected to awaken from his "deep sleep" by remembering "the pearl".

Drugs, alcohol, and other means to altered states of consciousness play a large role in the film. Pivotal scenes include the glittery high-rise party the film begins with, at a mansion full of Hollywood elites (where a patron urges Rick to attend a ketamine party, another patron wears a virtual reality headset, and two children play Wii Sports), and Rick's kaleidoscopic journey to Las Vegas with Karen. Various characters talk about drugs, with Clifton Collins Jr.'s character Jordan telling Nick Offerman's character Scott that "the sweet spot" to get women into in order to open them to seduction "is one Xanny, four white wines". Karen says, "You see, I took drugs once, and it kind of opened up this window for me. I call it the Window of Truth."

Production

Pre-production
In November 2011, the film was announced with Cate Blanchett, Christian Bale and Isabel Lucas mentioned as cast. It was also announced the film would be shot back-to-back with Song to Song. To prepare, Bale read Walker Percy's novel The Moviegoer, on Malick's suggestion.

Filming
Production on the film began in June 2012 and lasted nine weeks. During production, many of the cast and crew were spotted filming throughout Los Angeles County and Las Vegas, as most of the filming took place on the streets and in public places.

Although a script was written, Bale received no pages from it, while all other cast members received only pages of internal and verbal monologue for each shooting day. Bale later said that while filming, he was unclear about what the final film would actually be. During production, Malick used a process he calls "torpedoing", where a character is thrown into a scene without the other actors' advance knowledge, forcing them to improvise. In addition to a traditional studio, the cast also recorded their voice-over work in nontraditional places, such as in a van or by the side of the road.

Post-production
The film spent two years in post-production, which consisted of a small group of editors in the beginning and widened throughout.

Music
Hanan Townshend composed the score for the film. The album was released on March 4, 2016.

Release
The film premiered in the main competition section at the 65th Berlin International Film Festival on February 8, 2015. Shortly after, Broad Green Pictures acquired distribution rights to the film. The film had its American premiere at the Santa Barbara Film Festival on February 7, 2016, and was released in the United States on March 4, 2016.

Reception
Knight of Cups has received mixed reviews from critics. On review aggregator website Rotten Tomatoes, the film holds a 46% approval rating based on 175 reviews, with an average rating of 5.67 out of 10. The site's consensus reads, "Knight of Cups finds Terrence Malick delving deeper into the painterly visual milieu he's explored in recent efforts, but even hardcore fans may struggle with the diminishing narrative returns." On Metacritic, the film has a weighted average score of 53 out of 100 based on 41 reviews, indicating "mixed or average reviews".

Justin Chang of Variety called the film "flawed but fascinating" and a "feverish plunge into the toxic cloud of decadence" as Malick offers a "corrosive critique of Hollywood hedonism". Todd McCarthy of The Hollywood Reporter said that the "resolutely poetic and impressionist" film "conveys most bracingly [the] fleeting nature of human exchange", but the end result "is a certain tedium and repetitiveness along with the rhythmic niceties and imaginative riffs... this one mostly operates on a more dramatically mundane, private and even narcissistic level [than The Tree of Life]".

Moira Macdonald of The Seattle Times praised the film's "dreamlike" nature, but also stated that "you keep waiting for the film to come together, for Rick to emerge as a character rather than a cipher, for the women to seem less interchangeable — in short, for a point to it all. By its end, I was still waiting." Stephanie Zacharek of TIME wrote that the director "understands so little about women" and argued, "For loyal Malick fans, the woozy dream-logic visuals here may be enough. But this director is hardly the perceptive student of human nature he's cracked up to be." In The Arizona Republic, Bill Goodykoontz wrote, "I'm all for directors making audiences think, but ultimately, those thoughts need to lead us somewhere."

Some critics were very positive, with Matt Zoller Seitz of RogerEbert.com, who gave the film four out of four stars, stating, "Nobody else is making films like this. Not at this level...The sheer freedom of it is intoxicating." He acknowledged it would be "impenetrable and intolerable" for most audiences, and that "Knight of Cups is not a young man's movie...[It's a] philosophically engaged, beatific, starchild-as-old-man's movie." In another highly positive review, Richard Brody of The New Yorker called the film "an instant classic in several genres—the confessional, the inside-Hollywood story, the Dantesque midlife-crisis drama, the religious quest, the romantic struggle, the sexual reverie, the family melodrama" and considered it "one of the great recent bursts of cinematic artistry, a carnival of images and sounds that have a sensual beauty, of light and movement, of gesture and inflection, rarely matched in any movie that isn’t Malick’s own." Later, in a 2016 BBC poll, Seitz voted Knight of Cups the fifth-greatest film since 2000.

References

External links
 
 
 

2015 films
2015 fantasy films
2015 romantic drama films
American fantasy films
American romantic drama films
Broad Green Pictures films
FilmNation Entertainment films
Films directed by Terrence Malick
Films about actors
Films set in 2012
Films set in Los Angeles
Films shot in the Las Vegas Valley
Films shot in Los Angeles
Films about film directors and producers
Films about filmmaking
Films about striptease
Films about writers
Tarot in fiction
2010s English-language films
2010s American films